The 2019–20 season was Motherwell's thirty-fifth consecutive season in the top flight of Scottish football, having been promoted from the Scottish First Division at the end of the 1984–85 season. After the season was postponed on 13 March by the Scottish Football Association due to the COVID-19 pandemic, the season was curtailed on 18 May by the Scottish Professional Football League, with Motherwell finishing the season in third place with a points per game ration of 1.5333, 0.0333 higher than fourth placed Aberdeen. In the League Cup, Motherwell where knocked out by Heart of Midlothian in the Second Round, whilst St Mirren knocked Motherwell out of the Scottish Cup by penalties in a Fifth Round Reply.

Season review

Pre-season
On 10 June, Motherwell announced the singing of Chris Long to a one-year contract, beginning when his Blackpool expires on 30 June.
On 12 June, Motherwell announced that they had agreed a record transfer fee with Celtic for the transfer of midfielder David Turnbull, with the player given permission to discuss personal terms with Celtic. On 27 June Motherwell announced that the transfer had fallen through during the medical, with Turnbull requiring preventive surgery on his knee.
On 2 July, Motherwell announced the signing of Devante Cole on an initial six-month loan deal from Wigan Athletic.
On 8 July, Motherwell signed Sherwin Seedorf to a two-year contract from Wolverhampton Wanderers.
On 12 July, Motherwell announced the signing of Christian Ilić to a one-year contract.

July
On 18 July, manager Stephen Robinson and assistant manager Keith Lasley both agreed new contracts, keeping them at the club until the summer of 2022. The following day, Rohan Ferguson moved to Linfield for the 2019/20 season.

On 23 July, Allan Campbell signed an improved contract with Motherwell until the summer of 2021.
On 25 July, Motherwell announced the singing of Christy Manzinga on a one-year contract, with the option of a second, from Sporting Châtelet. The following day, 26 July, Danny Johnson moved to Dundee for an undisclosed fee, and Reece McAlear moved to Norwich City for an undisclosed.

On 2 September, Adam Livingstone joined Greenock Morton on a season-long loan deal, Craig Tanner declined a new contract from Motherwell and left the club, and Mark O'Hara joined on a season-long loan deal from Peterborough United.

September
On 12 September, Motherwell announced the signing of Bevis Mugabi on a contract until January 2020.

On 20 September, Motherwell announced that PJ Morrison had joined Cowdenbeath on an emergency one-week loan deal.

October
On 2 October, Motherwell announced that they had extended their contract with Liam Donnelly until the summer of 2022.

November
On 22 November, Motherwell announced that they had extended their contract with Bevis Mugabi until the summer of 2021.

January
On 7 January, Motherwell announced that Trevor Carson had signed a new contract with the club, until the summer of 2022.
On 13 January, Mikael Ndjoli joined Motherwell on loan from AFC Bournemouth for the remainder of the season.

On 15 January, Liam Grimshaw signed a new contract with Motherwell until the summer of 2022.

On 23 January, David Devine joined Queen of the South on loan for the remainder of the season.

On 28 January, Ross Maciver signed a new contract with Motherwell, keeping him at the club until the summer of 2021.

On 31 January, Casper Sloth left Motherwell by mutual consent, Rolando Aarons joined the club on loan from Newcastle United for the remainder of the season, and James Scott moved to Hull City for an undisclosed fee.

February
After returning to the club from his loan deal with Greenock Morton on 31 January, Adam Livingstone joined Clyde on loan for the remainder of the season on 4 February.

On 7 February, Motherwell announced the signing of Tony Watt on a contract until the end of the season.

March
On 9 March, Motherwell announced the signing of Harry Robinson on a contract until the end of the season.

On 11 March, David Turnbull signed a one-year extension to his contract, keeping him at Motherwell until the summer of 2022.

On 13 March, the Scottish Football Association postponed all league fixtures until further notice due to the COVID-19 pandemic.

May
On 18 May the season was curtailed by the Scottish Professional Football League with Motherwell finishing the season in third place with a points per game ration of 1.5333, 0.0333 higher than fourth placed Aberdeen.

On 29 May, Motherwell announced that Tony Watt had signed a new contract with the club, for the 2020–21 season.

On 31 May, Motherwell announced that Rohan Ferguson, Mark Gillespie, Richard Tait, Peter Hartley, Christian Ilić, Adam Livingstone and Christy Manzinga were all leaving the club after their contracts expired, whilst Charles Dunne, Chris Long, Barry Maguire, PJ Morrison, Harry Robinson and Yusuf Hussain have been offered new contracts with contracts due to expire too Lokopd.

Transfers

In

 Transfers announced on the above date, becoming official when the Scottish transfer window opened on 1 June.
 Transfers announced on the above date, becoming official when they're contracts expire on 30 June.

Out

Loans in

Loans out

Released

Squad

Out on loan

Left club during season

Friendlies

Competitions

Premiership

League table

Results by round

Results summary

Results

Scottish Cup

League Cup

Group stage

Table

Results

Knockout phase

Challenge Cup

Squad statistics

Appearances

|-
|colspan="12"|Players away from the club on loan:
|-
|colspan="12"|Players who left Motherwell during the season:

|}

Goal scorers

Clean sheets

Disciplinary record

See also
 List of Motherwell F.C. seasons

References

External links
 Motherwell F.C. Website
 BBC My Club Page
 Motherwell F.C. Newsnow

Motherwell F.C. seasons
Motherwell